The Early Admissions Game: Joining the Elite is a 2004 book which concerns early admission (a form of college admissions in the United States). The authors combine survey research with an empirical analysis of more than 500,000 applications to a number of colleges. They conclude that taking advantage of early applications significantly improves one's chances of admission.

See also
 College admissions in the United States
 Transfer admissions in the United States

References

External links
 Virtual book tour
 Harvard University Press site

2000 non-fiction books
Books about education
University and college admissions
Harvard University Press books